Rufus Jones may refer to:

 Rufus Jones (writer) (1863–1948), American writer, philosopher and Quaker
 Rufus R. Jones (1933–1993), American wrestler
 Parnelli Jones (born  1933), American racing driver; full name Rufus Parnell Jones
 Rufus E. Jones (born 1940), American politician
 Rufus Jones (actor) (born 1975), English actor, comedian and writer
 Rufus Jones (athlete) (born 1976), Grenadian Olympic sprinter
 Rufus "Speedy" Jones (1936–1990), American jazz drummer